A Swiss-system tournament is a non-eliminating tournament format that features a fixed number of rounds of competition, but considerably fewer than for a round-robin tournament; thus each competitor (team or individual) does not play all the other competitors. Competitors meet one-on-one in each round and are paired using a set of rules designed to ensure that each competitor plays opponents with a similar running score, but does not play the same opponent more than once. The winner is the competitor with the highest aggregate points earned in all rounds. With an even number of participants, all competitors play in each round.

The Swiss system is used for competitions in which there are too many entrants for a full round-robin (all-play-all) to be feasible, and eliminating any competitors before the end of the tournament is undesirable. In contrast, all-play-all is suitable if there are a small number of competitors; whereas a single-elimination (knockout) tournament rapidly reduces the number of competitors, but the best competitor may not necessarily win, as good competitors might have a bad day or eliminate and exhaust each other if they meet in early rounds.

Unlike group format or other systems in which all pairings are known from the beginning of the competition, in a Swiss system the match pairing for each round is done after the previous round has ended and depends on its results.

The Swiss system seeks to provide a clear winner with a large number of competitors and a relatively small number of rounds of competition, without a single bad result terminating participation.

The system was first employed at a chess tournament in Zurich in 1895 by Julius Müller, hence the name "Swiss system", and is now used in many games including chess, go, bridge and Scrabble.

Pairing procedure
During all but the first round, competitors are paired based on approximately how they have performed so far. In the first round, competitors are paired either randomly or according to some pattern that has been found to serve a given game or sport well. If it is desired for top-ranked participants to meet in the last rounds, the pattern must start them in different brackets, just the same as is done in seeding of pre-ranked players for a single elimination tournament. In subsequent rounds, competitors are sorted according to their cumulative scores and are assigned opponents with the same or similar score up to that point. The pairing rules have to be quite complicated, as they have to ensure that no two players ever oppose each other twice, and to avoid giving a player some advantage as a result of chance.

The detailed pairing rules are different in different variations of the Swiss system. As they are quite complicated, and it is undesirable to have a long delay between rounds to decide the pairings, the tournament organizer often uses a computer program to do the pairing.

In chess, a specific pairing rule, called "Dutch system" by FIDE, is often implied when the term "Swiss" is used. The Monrad system for pairing is commonly used in chess in Denmark and Norway, as well as in other sports worldwide. These two systems are outlined below.

Dutch system
The players are divided into groups, based on their score. Within each group with the same or similar score, players are ranked, based on rating or some other criteria. Subject to the other pairing rules, the top half is then paired with the bottom half. For instance, if there are eight players in a score group, number 1 is paired with number 5, number 2 is paired with number 6 and so on. Modifications are then made to prevent competitors from meeting each other twice, and to balance colors  (in chess). For this method to work, the score groups cannot be too small, and thus for smaller overall fields score groups are not a suitable approach.

Monrad system
The players are first ranked based on their score, then on their starting number (which can be random or based on seeding). Then #1 meets #2, #3 meets #4, etc., with modifications made to ensure that other rules are adhered to. Players are sorted by score (not score groups) and original rank, then each player paired to the next opponent, typically excluding repeats.  This is more suitable for smaller numbers of competitors.

The Monrad system used in chess in Denmark is quite simple, with players initially ranked at random, and pairings modified only to avoid players meeting each other twice. The Norwegian system has an optional seeding system for the first round pairings, and within a score group, the pairing algorithm endeavours to give players alternating colors.

The Monrad pairing system is widely used in Scrabble and is known as the King Of The Hill format. It is considered to be distinct from the Swiss pairing system.

Final scores and tie-breaking
There is a fixed number of rounds. After the last round, players are ranked by their score. If players remain tied, a tie-break score is used, such as the sum of all opponents' scores (Buchholz chess rating).

Analysis, advantages, and disadvantages
Assuming no drawn games, determining a clear winner (and, incidentally, a clear loser) would require the same number of rounds as that of a knockout tournament, which is the binary logarithm of the number of players rounded up. Thus three rounds can handle up to eight players, four rounds can handle up to sixteen players, ten rounds can handle up to one thousand and twenty-four players, and so on. If fewer than this minimum number of rounds are played, two or more players could finish the tournament with a perfect score, having won all their games but never having faced each other. Due to the fact that players should meet each other at most once and pairings are chosen dependent on the results, there is a natural upper bound on the number of rounds of a Swiss-system tournament, which is equal to half of the number of players rounded up. Should more than this number of rounds be played, the tournament might run into the situation that there is either no feasible round, or some players have to play each other a second time.

Compared to a knockout tournament, a Swiss system has the advantage of not eliminating anyone; a player who enters the tournament knows that they can play in all the rounds, regardless of results. The only exception is that one player is left over when there is an odd number of players. The player left over receives a bye: they do not play that round but are usually awarded the same number of points as for winning a game (e.g. one point for a chess tournament). The player is reintroduced in the next round and will not receive another bye.

Another advantage compared to knockout tournaments is that the final ranking gives some indication of the relative strengths of all contestants, not just of the tournament winner. By contrast, in a knockout tournament the second-best contestant is not necessarily the losing finalist, but could be any of the contestants defeated by the eventual tournament winner in earlier rounds.

In a Swiss-system tournament, sometimes a player has such a great lead that by the last round they are assured of winning the tournament even if they lose the last game. This has some disadvantages. First, a Swiss-system tournament does not always end with the exciting climax of a knockout final. Second, while the outcome of the final game has no bearing on first place, the first-place player can decide who wins second or third prize. In the 1995 All-Stars Tournament in Scrabble, tournament directors paired David Gibson, who had by then clinched first place, with the highest-ranked player who could not win a prize so that the second- and third-ranked players could compete between themselves for the final placements. The "Gibson Rule" is optional at Scrabble tournaments, as players at smaller tournaments may still have an incentive to win their last game to improve their overall rating. Players may also be "Gibsonized" if they have clinched a spot in the next round, and can be paired with the highest-ranked player who cannot possibly qualify for the next round.

The system is used for the selection of the English national pool team. Sixty-four players start the tournament and after six rounds, the top player will qualify as they will be unbeaten. The remaining seven places are decided after a series of round robins and playoffs.

Compared with a round-robin tournament, a Swiss tournament can handle many players without requiring an impractical number of rounds. An elimination tournament is better suited to a situation in which only a limited number of games may be simultaneously played in the tournament. For example, if a tennis tournament had sixty-four players, but only eight courts available, then not all matches in a round can be played at the same time. In a Swiss tournament, each round would have to be divided up into four waves of eight matches each. This would result in a total of twenty-four waves over the minimum six rounds. Conversely, for a single elimination tournament, the first round would require four waves, the next two, and all remaining rounds would consist of a single wave each. Over the same six rounds, only nine waves would occur. Note that the waves format is not strictly necessary, as instead a match could commence as soon as another in the same round ends, but the principle is largely the same.

In a Swiss tournament, all the results of a particular round need to be recorded before the next round may begin. This means that each round will take as long as its slowest match. In a single elimination tournament, any game may commence once the two preceding games that feed into it have been completed. This may result in one branch of the bracket falling behind if it has several slow matches in a row, but it may then catch up if it then has several quick matches. Additionally, each round has fewer matches than the previous, and the average longest match in a round will more closely match the average match as the number of matches in that round decreases.

Variations

Accelerated pairings
The method of accelerated pairings also known as accelerated Swiss is used in some large tournaments with more than the optimal number of players for the number of rounds.  This method pairs top players more quickly than the standard method in the opening rounds and has the effect of reducing the number of players with perfect scores more rapidly (by approximately a factor of 2 after two rounds).

For the first two rounds, players who started in the top half have one point added to their score for pairing purposes only.  Then the first two rounds are paired normally, taking this added score into account.  In effect, in the first round the top quarter plays the second quarter and the third quarter plays the fourth quarter.  Most of the players in the first and third quarters should win the first round.  Assuming this is approximately the case, in effect for the second round the top eighth plays the second eighth, the second quarter plays the third quarter and the seventh eighth plays the bottom eighth.  That is, in the second round, winners in the top half play each other, losers in the bottom half play each other, and losers in the top half play winners in the bottom half (for the most part).  After two rounds, about ⅛ of the players will have a perfect score, instead of ¼.  After the second round, the standard pairing method is used (without the added point for the players who started in the top half).

As a comparison between the standard Swiss system and the accelerated pairings, consider a tournament with eight players, ranked #1 through #8.  Assume that the higher-ranked player always wins.

Accelerated pairings do not guarantee that fewer players will have a perfect score. In round 2, if #5 and #6 score upset wins against #3 and #4, and there is a decisive result between #1 and #2, there will be three players with a perfect 2–0 score.

Danish system
The Danish system works in principle like a Monrad system, only without the restriction that no players can meet for a second time, so it is always #1 vs. #2, #3 vs. #4 etc.

Bridge team tournaments, if not played as "Round Robin", usually start with the Swiss system to make sure that the same teams would not play against each other frequently, but in the last one or two rounds there may be a switch to the Danish system, especially to allow the first two ranked teams to battle against each other for the victory, even if they have met before during the tournament. This would be more common if relatively few teams are involved. In a large field it is usually easy to match high-scoring teams who have not previously met.

Grand Prix system
In a few tournaments which run over a long period of time, such as a tournament with one round every week for three months, the Grand Prix system can be used. A player's final score is based on their best results (e.g. best ten results out of the twelve rounds). Players are not required to play in every round; they may enter or drop out of the tournament at any time. Indeed, they may decide to play only one game if they wish to, although once a player wants to get a prize they need to play more rounds to accumulate points. The tournament therefore includes players who want to go for a prize and play several rounds as well as players who only want to play an off game.

McMahon system
A variant known as the McMahon system tournament is the established way in which European Go tournaments are run. This differs mainly in that players have a skill ranking prior to the start of the tournament which determines their initial pairing in contrast to the basic Swiss-system approach where all players start at the same skill ranking. The McMahon system reduces the probability of a very strong team meeting a very weak team in the initial rounds. It is named for Lee E. McMahon (1931–1989) of Bell Labs.

Amalfi system
A tournament system in Italy. It is similar to the Swiss System, but does not split players based on their score. Before pairing any round, players are listed for decreasing score / decreasing rating, and the opponent of the first player in the list is the player following them by a number of positions equal to the number of remaining rounds, and so on for the other players. As consequence of this, the difference in rating between opponents at the first round is not so big (as for the accelerated systems), and ideally the "big match" between the first and the second one should occur at the last round, no matter how many players and rounds are in the tournament.

Applications

Badminton
International Student Badminton Tournaments depend on the Swiss ladder system to ensure its players get as many challenging matches as possible over the course of the badminton tournament. The tournaments are meant to promote both the sport and the social aspect of the game, hence its results are not connected to external rankings. Beforehand, players can enroll in three or four categories designed to separate national, regional and recreational players. Players of different clubs are coupled to form doubles and mixed doubles. The starting positions on each ladder (singles, doubles and mixed doubles) are random. Unlike in official matches a 1–1 draw is possible and games are usually not extended after 21 is reached in order to maximise the number of played matches.

Bridge
The Swiss system is used in some bridge tournament events, either pairs events or team matches. For teams, in each round, one team plays against another for several hands with the North/South pairs playing against their opponent's East/West pairs. The same hands are played at each table and the results compared using the International Match Point (IMP) scoring system. The difference between the total IMPs scored in the round is converted to Victory Points (VPs), with typically 20 VPs shared between the teams. In pairs, the initial scoring is by matchpoints which are then converted to VPs.

In the first round, teams are usually paired randomly; however, pairings can be based on other criteria. In subsequent rounds, the teams are ranked in order of the number of VPs they have accumulated in previous rounds, and the top team plays the second team, the third team plays the fourth team, etc., subject to the proviso that teams do not play each other twice.

Software may be employed to do pairings, and in the early rounds it will match teams with approximately the same score but it will not result in a precise 1 vs 2, 3 vs 4, etc.  This is done so that matches can begin before all teams have finished the previous round. In later rounds, the pairings are slower but more exact. In the last one or two rounds there may be a switch to the Danish system to make sure that each team plays the final match according to its actual ranking, even if this results in some teams playing against an opponent a second time.  At least in the US, this is extremely rare, usually employed only in  small club games with a large number of rounds relative to the number of teams.

Chess
In chess, each player is paired against another player with an equivalent performance score.  In "Round 1" of a chess tournament paired using the Swiss System, players usually are seeded according to their known playing strength, often a rating assigned to them by their local club, their national federation, or the world chess federation (FIDE).  In some events, especially when none or few of the players have an official chess rating, the players are paired randomly.  Once play begins, players who win receive a point, those who draw receive one-half of a point, and those who lose receive no points.  Win, lose or draw, all players proceed to the next round where winners are paired against opponents with equal performance scores (e.g. Round 1's winners play each other, Round 1's draws play each other, etc.).  In later rounds (typical tournaments have anywhere from 3-9 rounds), players face opponents with the same (or almost the same) score.  No player is paired up against the same opponent twice.

The rules for Swiss System chess events also try to ensure that each player plays an equal number of games with white and black.  Alternating colors in each round is the most preferable and the same color is never repeated three times in a row.

Players with the same score are ideally ranked according to rating. Then the top half is paired with the bottom half.  For instance, if there are eight players in a score group, number 1 is paired to play number 5, number 2 is paired to play number 6 and so on.  When the tournament, or a section of the tournament, has an odd number of players, one player usually is assigned a "Bye"—e.g. a round where the player is not paired.  Modifications are then made to balance colors and prevent players from meeting each other twice.

The first national event in the United States to use the Swiss system was in Corpus Christi, Texas in 1945; and the first Chess Olympiad using it was held in Haifa in 1976.

In chess, the terms Swiss and Monrad are both used and denote systems with different pairing algorithms. The Monrad pairing system is commonly used in Denmark and Norway, while most of the rest of the world uses one of the Swiss systems defined by FIDE. In most other sports, only one format is used and is known either as Monrad or Swiss.

Croquet

Croquet tournaments are frequently run using a Swiss system, often flexibly so that the order of players is not strictly maintained, avoiding players waiting around for long games to finish. Variants include the Burridge Swiss, used as a qualifying stage for a subsequent elimination, in which there is a predetermined threshold of games. Once a player reaches that threshold, the player will no longer be included in the Swiss and will have qualified. Once a player can no longer reach the threshold, they are eliminated from the Swiss. The number of rounds is about double that of the threshold.

Curling

Curling uses a variation called the Schenkel system.

Like a Swiss tournament, the Schenkel ensures that after the first round teams will play against teams with similar levels of success so far. That means that after the first round the pairs for the second round would be first-ranked team against the second, third against fourth, and so on.

In a true Swiss tournament all teams play in one group. However, in a curling arena there are a limited number of curling sheets available at any one time. Therefore, the teams are usually divided into groups, and the groups are rearranged after a round or two.

The criteria used for ranking are, in order:
 points won (2 points for victory in a game, 1 point for a tie, none for a loss)
 total ends won so far
 total stone-points scored
 stone ratio (stone-points scored minus stone-points conceded)

Debate tabs
British Parliamentary Style debate competitions have four rather than two teams in each debate.  The preliminary round for many such competitions, including the World Universities Debating Championship, ranks teams by a modified form of Swiss tournament, usually called a tab.  "Tab" also denotes to the software used for scheduling of rounds and tabulation of results.  Teams are ranked from first to fourth in each debate and awarded from three down to zero points. Teams with similar points totals are grouped off for each successive round. Just as chess Swiss tournaments are arranged to ensure players have a balance of playing with black pieces and white pieces, so too debate tournaments attempt to provide teams with a balance of places in the speaking order (i.e. Opening Government, Opening Opposition, Closing Government, and Closing Opposition).  With four competitors rather than two, significantly greater compromise is required to balance the ideal requirements of, on the one hand, a team not meeting the same opponent twice and, on the other hand, a team having a balanced mix of places in the running order.

Esports
Mind Sports South Africa, the national body for esports in South Africa, uses a Swiss system for all its tournaments. For its Swiss implementations, players receive three points for a win and only one for a draw and no player can play against another player more than once. There is the further provision that no player may play against another player from the same club in the first round as long as no one club has 40% of the entrants. Overwatch Open Division also makes use of the Swiss system, as well as the Hearthstone Global Games tournament.

A variation of Swiss system common in esports tournaments sees participants play until reaching the preset number of wins or losses, instead of having everyone play the same number of games. In this system, player or team that wins the required number of games advances to the next stage of the tournament and doesn't play any more games in this stage; conversely, those who lose enough games are eliminated from the tournament. This system was used for the first time by ESL during qualifying rounds for the ESL One Cologne 2016 tournament, and has been used since then in all Counter-Strike: Global Offensive Major Championships. The format was also used for the Dota 2 Kiev Major tournament in 2017, Magic: The Gathering Arena Mythic Championship tournaments, and Gears of War Gears Esports Events. This format is also used in the recent format of Rocket League's RLCS X's Fall Split, as well as all international major tournaments and the world championship of RLCS 2021-2022.

The Swiss format will first be used in the 2023 League of Legends World Championship.

Go
Relatively few Go tournaments use the Swiss system.  Most amateur Go tournaments, at least in Europe and America, now use the McMahon system instead. Swiss-system tournaments must start with very unequal matches in the early rounds—"slaughter pairing" is the name of one initial pattern used—if the Swiss pairing rules applied subsequently are to allow the top players to meet in the latest rounds. The McMahon system is designed to give all players games against similarly skilled players all along, and to produce final standings that more accurately reflect the true current skill levels of players.

Gwent
One of the two qualifying tournaments for the Gwent Open and Gwent World Masters, the official tournaments for the card game Gwent, partially employ the Swiss system. The Qualifier #2 consist of two days, the first of which is played with Swiss-system selection with best-of-three competition for each pair of players. The second round instead employs double elimination and best-of-five. The more exclusive Qualifier #1 only uses the double-elimintation, best-of-five format. The actual tournaments (Gwent Open and Gwent World Masters) are single-elimination best-of-five. Thus the Swiss system is only used as preselection for preselection (who gets to progress to day 2, who then gets to go to the tournament).

Magic: the Gathering
The DCI, the tournament sanctioning body for the card game Magic: The Gathering, uses a Swiss system for most tournaments. Unlike with other Swiss implementations, players receive three points for a win and only one for a draw. After sufficient rounds to mathematically ensure that players with a record of one loss or better will be ranked in the top eight players, typically the top eight players advance to a single-elimination stage, with several statistics used as tie-breakers. The minimum number of players to top 8 are 16 or more, and top 4 with 8 players or more, and top 2 (if necessary) if there are 4 or more players.

Grand Prix main events are split into two days. On day 1, eight or more Swiss rounds are played, where anyone with at least 18 match points (a record of 6-2 or better) will advance to day two. On day two, seven more Swiss rounds are played, followed by a cut to the top eight single elimination stage.

Pokémon
Tournaments in the Pokémon Trading Card Game and Video Game Championships use a combination of the Swiss system and single-elimination.  The tournament begins as a Swiss-system tournament.  At the end of the Swiss rounds, the top players advance to a single-elimination tournament (also known as the Top Cut).  In previous years, the Top Cut would include between 12.5 and 25 percent of the original number of participants (e.g. if there were 64 to 127 players, there would be a Top 16).

As of the 2013–2014 season, Swiss rounds in City, State, Regional, National, and World Championships are played best-of-three, with a 50-minute plus three-turn time limit.  Ties were introduced into the Swiss round portion of the tournaments in the 2013–2014 season for the first time since 2002–2003. A win is worth 3 match points, a tie is worth 1 match point, and a loss is worth 0 match points.

Top Cut rounds are played best-of-three, with a 75-minute plus three-turn time limit.

Also, the Regional and National Championships were contested as two-day Swiss tournaments, where only the top 32 players from Day One would continue in another Swiss tournament in Day Two, prior to a Top 8 based on the two-day record. In recent seasons, a Day One total of 19 match points (i.e. a record of 6-2-1 or better) guaranteed a berth in Day 2, even if more than 32 players had 19+ match points.

League Challenge and Pre-Release tournaments are played solely as a Swiss system.  Local tournaments may or may not have a Top Cut.

The tiebreakers are in the order of Opponents' Win Percentage, Opponents' Opponents' Win Percentage, and Head to Head. If there are more than two tied players before Head to Head is applied or the two players haven't played each other, the order is determined randomly.

Scrabble
In some Scrabble tournaments, a system known variously as "modified Swiss", "Portland Swiss", "Fontes Swiss" or "speed pairing" is used, whereby first players are placed in groups of four, and play three rounds of round-robin play, and subsequently are paired as in Swiss pairing, but using the standings as of the second to last round, rather than the last round.  This has the advantage of allowing the tournament directors to already know who plays whom by the time given players are finished with a round, rather than making the players wait until all players have finished playing a given round before being able to start the time-consuming pairing process.

Commonly used in Australia, and now in many other countries, is a system known as "Australian Draw". Whereby each round is paired using a normal #1 plays #2, #3 plays #4, etc. except that repeat pairings within a selected range of previous games is forbidden. Often, for shorter tournaments the selected range will be since the very first round of the tournament, thus never having a repeat pairing for the entire tournament. For longer tournaments it is also common to have the first N rounds use the Australian Draw system, and followed by one or more "King Of the Hill" rounds. "King Of the Hill" is a strict #1 plays #2, #3 plays #4, etc. with no regard to previous pairings, thus unlimited repeat pairings are allowed.

Although labelled as 'Australian Version of Swiss Pairing' it is more akin to the King Of The Hill pairing system, than to the Swiss - Dutch system. As in chess, when the term Swiss Pairing is used, it's usually a reference to the Swiss Dutch System.

Sumo
In professional sumo in Japan, the six bi-monthly  use a proprietary system similar to the McMahon system, with rikishi generally fighting those near their ranking on the banzuke; the winner of a division is the rikishi with the best record at the conclusion of tournament's 15 days. However, unlike other tournament utilizing a Swiss or McMahon system, match-ups are not determined by a formula but rather the desires of a committee of elders, with restrictions against repeat match-ups, bouts between close relatives like siblings, or bouts between members of the same stable.

Ultimate Frisbee
Windmill Windup, a three-day yearly Ultimate Frisbee tournament held in Amsterdam, was the first event in ultimate to introduce the Swiss draw system into the sport in 2005. In later years, many other tournaments started using this format, like Belgium's G-spot, Wisconsin Swiss and many others.
For each round, teams earn victory points based on the score difference of their win (or loss). In this way, also a team clearly losing a game is encouraged to fight for every point in order to get more victory points. After each round, teams are ranked according to their victory points. Ties are broken by considering the sum of the current victory points of their opponents. In the next round, neighboring teams in the ranking play each other. In case they have played each other in a previous round, adjustments to the rankings are made. After five rounds of Swiss draw, the top 8 teams play three playoff rounds to determine the final placement of the teams. All other teams continue with the Swiss draw in the remaining rounds.

Wargames

The International Wargames Federation, the international body for wargames, uses a Swiss system for all its tournaments. For its Swiss implementations, players receive three points for a win and only one for a draw and no player can play against another player more than once. There is the further proviso that no player may play against another player from the same country in the first round as long as no one country has 40% of the entrants. For national championships such rule is amended to read that no player can play against a player from the same club in the first round as long as no one club has 40% of the entrants.

Yu-Gi-Oh! Trading Card Game
Konami Digital Entertainment of the United States uses proprietary software for their sanctioned and official tournaments. Konami Tournament Software (KTS) is what is supplied to the Tournament Organizers to run each tournament. The software utilized the Swiss system similarly to Magic: The Gathering—3 points for a win, 1 for a draw, 0 for a loss.

Konami's official tournament policy dictates how many rounds are played based on the number of participants. After the set number of Swiss system rounds are complete, there is generally a cut to advance in the tournament. This is then played as single-elimination until a winner is declared.

See also
 Tie-breaking in Swiss-system tournaments
Other tournament systems
Round-robin tournament
Single-elimination tournament
Double-elimination tournament
Scheveningen system

References

External links
Detailed rules from FIDE on the Swiss pairing system
Comparison of Swiss and Round Robin formats
 Swiss Backgammon Tournament System
SWIPS: Free Swiss pairing system for chess tournaments

Chess tournament systems
Tournament systems
1895 in chess